Events from the year 1721 in Canada.

Incumbents
French Monarch: Louis XV
British and Irish Monarch: George I

Governors
Governor General of New France: Philippe de Rigaud Vaudreuil
Colonial Governor of Louisiana: Jean-Baptiste Le Moyne de Bienville
Governor of Nova Scotia: John Doucett
Governor of Placentia: Samuel Gledhill

Events
 800 Acadians take oath of allegiance to the French.

Births

Deaths

Historical documents
Get-rich-quick attitude hinders early development of New France

French governor and intendant want Indigenous allies to resist British, possibly with their direct support (Note: "savages" used)

Sisters of the Congregation in Montreal "are poor[...]and poorly nourished, although indefatigable" in serving at Hôtel-Dieu

Council of Marine informed of Montreal fire losses, including 138 houses and "more than one million to the merchants and bourgeois"

Intendant of Canada encourages alliance of Indigenous people and Acadians to drive British from Nova Scotia

Call to move Newfoundlanders off island after William Keen and other residents have enough of murder and other "great disorders"

"Dayly Cry here is for Justice" - Nova Scotia Governor and Council authorize themselves to be court of justice meeting quarterly

Recommendation to expel French inhabitants of Nova Scotia, who refuse to give allegiance to Crown and divert trade to French ports

"Promising beginnings" - New York gratifies Five Nations with deal for Lake Ontario trading post plus proof of French lies to them

Illustration: Five Nations "Indian sachems" meeting with N.Y. Gov. Burnet give him beaver for his new wife (Note: racial stereotypes)

With French favouring might over treaty right, Britain must make itself "considerable" in American colonies and build frontier forts

Detailed description of French routes from Montreal to their settlements on Mississippi River

Names and numbers of Indigenous allies of French detailed and compared with far fewer British allies

As France has done, Britain should reinforce its bonds with Indigenous peoples through gifts, marriage, religion, trade and treaties

References

 
Canada
21